Luís Henriques de Barros Lopes (born 16 February 2000), commonly known as Duk, is a professional footballer who plays as a forward for Scottish side Aberdeen. Born in Portugal, he represents Cape Verde at international level.

Career
Duk began his career at Benfica, playing 42 games for the B side across 2 seasons, scoring 11 goals. 
In July 2022, Duk signed for Aberdeen on a three-year deal from Benfica for an undisclosed fee. 

Internationally, Duk has represented Portugal at Under-18 and U19 level, but made his international debut for Cape Verde in 2022.

Career statistics

Club

References

2000 births
Living people
Portuguese footballers
Portugal youth international footballers
Footballers from Lisbon
Cape Verdean footballers
Portuguese people of Cape Verdean descent
Association football forwards
Liga Portugal 2 players
Sporting CP footballers
C.F. Os Belenenses players
S.L. Benfica B players
Aberdeen F.C. players
Scottish Professional Football League players
Expatriate footballers in Scotland
Portuguese expatriate footballers
Portuguese expatriate sportspeople in Scotland
Cape Verdean expatriate footballers
Cape Verdean expatriate sportspeople in Scotland